The 2022 Wake Forest Demon Deacons men's soccer team represented Wake Forest University during the 2022 NCAA Division I men's soccer season. It was the 76th season of the university fielding a program. It was the program's eighth season with Bobby Muuss as head coach. The Demon Deacons played their home matches at Spry Stadium.

The Demon Deacons finished the season 14–6–0 overall and 5–3–0 in ACC play to finish in second place in the Atlantic Division. As the fourth overall seed in the ACC Tournament they defeated Virginia Tech in the Second Round before losing to Clemson in the Quarterfinals. They received an at-large bid to the NCAA Tournament.

Background

The Demon Deacons finished the season 13–7–1 overall and 4–3–1 in ACC play to finish in third place in the Atlantic Division.  As the sixth overall seed in the ACC Tournament they defeated Virginia in the First Round before losing to Duke in the Quarterfinals.  They received an at-large bid to the NCAA Tournament.  They were an unseeded team and defeated Mercer in the First Round and thirteenth seed FIU in the Second Round before losing to fourth seed Notre Dame to end their season.

Player movement

Players leaving

Players arriving

Incoming Transfers

Recruiting Class

Squad

Roster

Team management

Source:

Schedule

Source:

|-
!colspan=6 style=""| Exhibition

|-
!colspan=6 style=""| Regular season

|-
!colspan=6 style=""| ACC Tournament

|-
!colspan=6 style=""| NCAA Tournament

Awards and honors

Rankings

References

2022
Wake Forest Demon Deacons
Wake Forest Demon Deacons
Wake Forest Demon Deacons
Wake Forest